Book folding is the stage of the book production process in which the pages of the book are folded after printing and before binding.

Until the middle of the 19th century, book folding was done by hand, and was a trade.  In the 1880s and 1890s, book folding machines by Brown and Dexter came onto the market, and by the 1910s hand-folding was rare, with one publisher declaring them to be "practically obsolete" in 1914.

The folding process is also necessary to produce print products other than books—for instance mailings, magazines, leaflets etc.

Hand folding

Folding machines

Two main types of mechanisms are commonly employed in folding machines: buckle folders and knife folders.

Buckle folder
In a buckle folder, the paper is first passed through 2 spinning rollers, which feed the paper into a pair of guide plates that redirect the paper at a slight angle, bending the paper. At the far end of the guide plates is a "paper stop". As the rollers continue to spin, the paper continues to slide in between the guides until it hits the paper stop, then, having nowhere else to go, buckles at the interface between the rollers and the angled guides. As the rollers continue to spin, the buckle increases, until it is eventually caught by a pair of "nip" rollers, which pull the buckle in and compresses and flattens it into a neat crease.

Adjusting the paper stop in a buckle folder determines where the fold will be placed. Also, a buckle folder may contain only 3 rollers, with one shared by both the input rollers and the nip rollers.

Although buckle folders are fast, simple, efficient, and have small folding tolerances, they are not suitable for substrate of very low (<40g/m2) or very heavy paper grammage (>120g/m2).

Knife folder
In a knife folder, a sheet of paper is fed horizontally over 2 unpowered rollers until it hits a paper stop, at which point a dull blade pushes down on the paper and in between the 2 rollers to create the fold.

Although the knife folder is slower than buckle folders, it is more precise and can handle extreme grammages very well. It also has small folding tolerances, but is a more complex machine.

Folding variants

Parallel folds
Folding a paper more than once in the same direction (i.e. with parallel creases) is called parallel folding. Common examples of this are the half fold, letter fold, gate fold, and Z-fold.

Cross folds
A cross fold is when a paper is folded once, then rotated 90 degrees and folded again. The creases therefore cross each other at right angles. The most basic cross fold is the French fold, or right-angle fold. Other examples include the 16-page broadside and the 12-page letter.

See also
 Book
 Book publishing
 Paper size (influenced by the number of folds)

References

Book arts
Print production